Aniche is a commune in the Nord département in the Hauts-de-France region of northern France.

The commune, located in the Nord-Pas-de-Calais mining area, long lived on the mining of coal with fourteen pits on its territory. Eleven pits were owned by the Aniche Mining Company and three by the Compagnie des mines d'Azincourt (Agincourt Mining Company).

The inhabitants of the commune are known as Anichois or Anichoises.

History

Middle Ages
In the early 12th century, Marchiennes Abbey owned the altar and tithes which had previously been owned by Anselm le Barbu, Count of Ostrevant, and his successors
On 27 April 1181, Philippe, Count of Flanders and Vermandois, was at the Saint-Martin of Aniche basilica in the presence of the relics of the Virgin Eusebia. He regulated the rights of the Abbey on tithing.
In 1209, Bauduin of Obrechicourt, knight, waived his rights for tithes from Aniche.
In 1219, Robert, sire of Aniche, made an award in favour of the Abbey for land that he contested with Jean le Mirail d'Aniche.
In 1340, during the Hundred Years War, the people of Douai, France's allies, burned the village which was considered pro-British.

Aniche and Auberchicourt long had the same lords.

Cartulary of Duke Charles de Croy

The Gouache painting (opposite) was probably painted in 1603 and appears in the Albums de Croÿ. It is part of a wide range of topographical paintings made at the request of the Duke of Croy: an oval with a bird's-eye view of the landscape is framed in the four corners by four naked male figures with those at the top facing and the lower ones facing to the rear. The oval medallion contains a cartouche with the name of the village over a representation of the landscape seen from the south in late summer (see the plowed field and leaves on the trees).

In the foreground
A road on the left with two figures. This road would be the way from Bouchain to Auberchicourt and Douai.
In the centre bottom a shepherd on a hill with four sheep with a further ten sheep between the path and the plowed field.

In the background
The village houses grouped around the church on the edge of the plowed field. Note that the artist has featured hooks on the church roof which trapped snow and also allowed the hanging of ladders for maintenance of the slates. Two turrets are visible on the side of the church with spires covered with slate.
Seven buildings to the left of the church, eleven to the right all with 2 sided roofs.
The church dominates the centre of the medallion with the bell tower on the left with a spire and four Fléchons covered with slate, angled and louvred, the choir on the right with four high bays whose roof is lower than the nave. The nave seems be made of four bays without an aisle. The choir appears to be of Roman style, narrower and lower and unusually elongated (with three spans). This church differs from the present church which was rebuilt from 1857 to 1859 and the tower rebuilt in 1872.
Another impressive building is located on the right.

In the far background
A dominant hill on the right.

From the 16th century to the Revolution

In 1616, Peter Paul Rubens came to Cambrai from his Rubenshuis in Antwerp and, in passing Lille, stopped at Aniche and left three paintings including The Entombment and two smaller ones: a Saint Francis and a Saint Clare. For The Entombment (also called the Descent from the Cross), Rubens painted the Christ naked. According to Eugéne-Bouly de Lesdain it is no longer intact: "A foreign hand cast a veil of decency on the painting which he felt obliged to impose". An alien hand that may be attributed to Anonymous of Antwerp.

The Entombment by Rubens is always visible in the Church of Saint-Gery of Cambrai.

Under Charles V Aniche became a possession of the King of Spain until the Treaty of Nijmegen in 1678 when the Chatellenie of Bouchain returned to Louis XIV, King of France.
In 1686, Eugène de Sainte-Adelgonde, Baron of Bours and Rieulay held the right of high justice in the land of Aniche under letters patent of engagement (lettres-patentes d'engagière).
In 1778, on the night of 11 to 12 September, the discovery of coal in the Sainte Catherine pit caused the expansion and transformation of village society. The Marquis de Traisnel Company and Claude-Constant Juvénal d'Harville des Ursins, then the owner of the manor, became the Aniche Mining Company - the second largest coal company in France after the Anzin Mining Company.

18th century
On the morning of 7 February 1827 at the Saint Hyacinthe pit, fire broke out in an access passage for the workers to descend into the pit. Thick smoke spread inside the mine and asphyxiated 46 workers employed in the coal extraction tunnels. Seven young men and two fathers were found dead. 
 Location of the Saint Hyacinthe pit

From the 19th century to the present day

After the creation of the first glassworks in 1823, Aniche became, from the middle of the 19th century, the French capital of the window glass industry and went from 4,000 to 7,500 inhabitants in 1900. The Antoine Lumière & son plates and photographic papers Company (Lyon) were supplied by the Glassworks of the Station, better known under the name "Belotte Glass".

On 28 November 1900, 21 workers were killed by the explosion of 148 kg of dynamite in the Fenelon pit owned by the Aniche Mining Company.

The First World War caused a sharp slowdown in industrial activity and led to the destruction by the occupying power of the majority of installations before their departure in October 1918.

The occupation lasted 49 months from September 1914 to 20 October 1918 when the village was liberated by British forces. There were 314 war victims from Aniche: 299 at the front or from injuries and 15 civilian victims.

The period between the wars saw the decline of the mining industry with the cessation of operations of the last pit in 1938 and the final closure of the glassworks at the beginning of the Second World War.

Heraldry

Geography
Aniche is located some 15 km south-east of Douai and some 7 km north-west of Douchy-les-Mines in the heart of the old Ostrevent region. Access is by the D943 road from Bouchain in the south-east passing through the commune to the town. There is also the D645 from Auberchicourt in the west passing through the town and continuing east to Abscon. The D47 road comes from Bruille-lez-Marchiennes in the north passing through the town and continuing south-west to Monchecourt. More than half of the commune consists of the urban area of Aniche town with the rest of the commune in the east and south farmland.

Geology and terrain
On 27 December 1893, an earthquake occurred in the glass-making district which indicated a seismic risk that the coal mines then more or less took into account.

Communications and transport
Aniche is connected to Douai by bus route 1 (Aniche-Guesnain) which connects with Tram A (Guesnain-Douai) of the SMTC of Douai, as well as routes 211 (Guesnain-Denain via Aniche), 210 (Aniche-Somain), and 201 (Aniche-Villeneuve d'Ascq) operated by the Arc-en-Ciel network.

Phase 3 of Route A will link Aniche on the Évéole network of autobuses to Douai. The line will link the Champ de la Nation in the centre of town and pass along the Rue Henri-Barbusse.

The commune was served by rail transport through Aniche station which was demolished in 2010.

Neighbouring communes and villages

Source:

Toponymy
The name of Aniche (Anic) was mentioned for the first time in 1103 in a list of the possessions of the abbey of Marchiennes, then as Enice in 1113 and Henice in 1181. It was in 1219 that the name Aniche appears under the seal of Robert, Lord of Aniche and of Auberchicourt.

In Flemish, the commune is called Anik.

Administration

List of Successive Mayors

Mayors from 1930

Twin towns – sister cities

Aniche is twinned with:
 Bobingen, Germany (1969)
 Nový Bor, Czech Republic (1990)

Demography
According to historians, in 1540 Aniche had 47 fires of which 7 were of ploughmen (the others had no horse & carts or other animals). In 2017 the commune had 10,244 inhabitants.

Distribution of age groups
Percentage Distribution of Age Groups in Aniche and Nord Department in 2017

Source: INSEE

Culture and heritage

Sites and monuments

L'Idéal Cinéma Jacques Tati. Its first show was on 23 November 1905. Demolished and rebuilted in 1995.
The Théodore Monod College is the largest college of the Academy of Lille
The Church of Saint Martin built in 1855-1859 by the architect Charles Leroy
The War Memorial 1914-1918 located in the Berrioz Square and opened on 9 November 1924 (314 victims from Aniche).
The College of Saint Joseph, a former hospital during the war.
Saint Joseph School
The pyramid

Notable people linked to the commune
1770: Auguste-Louis Lanvin
1780: Joseph-François Désiré born in Aniche on 19 September 1780, decorated with the Legion of Honour
1784: Joséphine Rostkowska, Polish heroine
1787: Napoléon Bonaparte (1769–1821), then a junior officer billeted in the Douai barracks. He passionated about the project of Lapérouse in his expedition around the world.
1810: Adolphe Patoux, native of Saint-Hilaire-lez-Cambrai, former glass blower, founded a glassworks at Aniche in 1864
1833: Robert Eugène des Rotours, Baron of Rotours (of Chaulieu), born at Aniche on 23 October 1833, died at Paris on 28 March 1895, a lawyer, counsellor for the préfecture (1861), Mayor of Avelin (1868-1888), Member of the Legislative Chamber from 2 February 1868 to 28 March 1895, municipal councillor then Mayor of Mérignies, and general counsel for the Canton of Orchies; married in Paris on 10 May 1859 to Emma Joséphine Ghislaine van den Hecke de Lambeke; buried in the church of Avelin with his wife.
1835: Charles Patoux, born at Aniche on 2 February 1835. Former Mayor of Aniche, Chevalier of the Legion of Honour with Adolphe Patoux, both buried in the family vault in the central aisle of the cemetery in Aniche.
1885: Léon Lehuraux, Méhariste officer, writer, and ethnologist, born at Aniche on 29 December 1885, died on 8 June 1956.

1880: Vincent van Gogh beginning in March 1880 he took his suitcase under his arm with some drawings and 10 francs to meet the painter Jules Breton who practiced at Courrières in the Pas-de-Calais. He took the train from Mons to Valenciennes, arriving in heavy rain and hurricane winds. To avoid the Forest of Raismes-Saint-Amand-Wallers, he travelled via Denain possibly by the horse-drawn tram shown on the map of the Arrondissement of Valenciennes then by Escaudain, Auberchicourt, Lewarde, then Douai to arrive at Courrières. Jules Breton was not there. His house and his workshop seemed too plush. The return trip was completely on foot in difficult conditions with a pilgrimage to Borinage. He sold some drawings for subsistence. On 24 September 1880 he wrote to his brother Theo that on the way back he finally found his way: painting. "It is for me to learn to draw or to be master of my pencil, or my charcoal, or my brush and once I got that I can do good work almost anywhere. Borinage is as picturesque as old Venice, Arabia, Brittany, Normandy, Picardy, or Brie". He still had ten years of life to achieve some 2,000 works.
1888: Louis Pol born at Aniche on 9 September 1888 and died there on 24 June 1958. A Glass worker; glassblower at the Union glassworks. From 1921-1955 he was Director of L'Idéal Cinéma Jacques Tati; secretary of the rescue unit of glassworkers of Aniche from 1922 to reunification in 1935. As a member of the Communist Party, he was elected mayor in December 1932 but was revoked in February 1933 because of the virulence of his public actions at the head of the municipality. Elected deputy mayor in 1935, he was removed from office in 1939 under the Daladier Decree.
1909: Michel Leduc, born at Aniche on 12 March 1909, died at Six-Fours-les-Plages near Toulon (Var) on 15 November 1986. Artistic Director of the Opéra de Marseille for 12 years and Director of the Municipal theatre of Avignon for 17 years.
1912: Charles Fenain born in Aniche on 14 September 1912, died at Douai on 4 February 1997. Elected three times as Mayor of Douai, he held this position from 1965 to 1983. He was the architect of many achievements particularly in the field of urban planning and in heritage restoration at Douai and he worked for the development of industrial zones in Douai.
1921: Frédéric Deloffre, born 27 July 1921 in Aniche, died at Antony, Hauts-de-Seine, on 4 April 2008, academic, specialist in French literature of the 18th century, he was one of the founders in 1968 of the UNI organization in response to student protest movements.
1922: Norbert Ségard born in Aniche on 3 October 1922, died at Lille on 1 February 1981, physicist, French politician and minister.
1922: Georges Hugot (1922–2000), artist and sculptor, professor at the School of Fine Arts of Douai. He was the creator of numerous sculptures installed in Aniche such as the Monument of Glass and of Coal. Deputy Mayor of Aniche from 1983 to 1995, he initiated and developed cultural policy in the commune. He was responsible for the reconstruction of the "Ideal" cinema which was named L'Idéal Cinéma Jacques Tati in 1995.
1925: Louis Thbaut, born in Aniche on 15 April 1925, 1st overall in the French dissertation competition in 1943, became a teacher and college professor. He resumed university studies in 1969 and obtained the title of Doctor of the 3rd cycle with a thesis on Pierre-Joseph Laurent. Co-founder of the Aniche Historical Society, he died on 9 August 1985 in Lozère and is buried in "the square of the poor" at Tortequesne.
1925: Lazare Gianessi, born in Aniche on 9 November 1925 and died on 11 August 2009 in Concarneau, a former international footballer.
1946: Jean Bodart President from 2001 to 2012 of Four Days of Dunkirk.
1950: Roger Facon, born in Monchecourt on 20 January 1950, he was oriented towards a career in animation before becoming a police investigator. Fascinated by the culture and especially writing, he became a polygrapher, paying particular attention to the occult and early literature. He found his way by publishing detective novels largely inspired by his professional experience. He led writing and theatrical expression workshops, created photo-novels which he sold to the public. In 2001 he was elected in Aniche and became assistant to culture; he created the biennial thriller that brings together fifty of the most famous people in this discipline.
1957: Michel Sanchez, musician.
1970: Valérie Bonneton, born at Somain, actress, ex-wife of François Cluzet.
1971: Pascal Françaix, writer, author of fantasy novels.
1976: François Jouvenet, president of Scheldt district football, President of the Nord-Pas de Calais Football league, and chairman of the Central Committee of the Coupe de France of Football, lived in Aniche for many years.
1980: Audrey Françaix, editor and French writer.

Folklore
Alexandre-Joseph Consil known as Kopierre was born in Auberchicourt, the neighbouring commune, on 25 May 1834 and died at the Aniche Hospice on 28 December 1909. He was Drum Major of the Saint-Cyr school during the 14 July parade in Paris in 1879. He was a picturesque character in Nord department.

See also
Communes of the Nord department

References

External links

 
Aniche on Lion1906
Aniche on Géoportail, National Geographic Institute (IGN) website 
Aniche on the 1750 Cassini Map

Communes of Nord (French department)
French Hainaut